Kiskatinaw may refer to:
Kiskatinaw River, a river in British Columbia, Canada
Kiskatinaw Provincial Park, a park in British Columbia, Canada
Kiskatinaw Formation, a stratigraphical unit in the Western Canadian Sedimentary Basin